Tjokorda Gde Raka Soekawati (new spelling: Cokorda Gde Raka Sukawati), (15 January 1899 in Ubud, Gianyar, Bali – 1967) was the only President of the State of East Indonesia from 1946 to its disestablishment in 1950.

Biography 
His title Tjokorda Gde indicates that Soekawati belonged to the highest ksatria (one of the four noble castes in Bali).

In his young years, Soekawati attended a school for Indonesian officials. In 1918 he was an official Indonesian candidate appointed by the Bandung auditors. At the end of the same year he was mantripolitie (a title for indigenous officials) to Denpasar. In 1919, he had political ambitions and was promoted to Punggawa (district) of his birthplace Ubud. In 1924 he was elected member of the People's Council, which he held until 1927. Then, in the same year, he was a member of the board of delegates of the People's Council. At the end of 1931 he went to study in Europe. In 1932 he continued his journey to the Netherlands to study agriculture and animal husbandry.

Between 18 and 24 December 1946, he attended the conference in Denpasar and was chosen as interim president of the State of East Indonesia. The conference also led to the formation of the Provisional Parliament of East Indonesia. On 21 April 1950, he successfully negotiated East Indonesia's integration into a unitary Republic of Indonesia, heeding majority support for a unitary state.

He had a Balinese wife Gusti Agung Niang Putu of which a son was born Tjokorda Ngurah Wim Sukawati. In 1933 Tjokorda Raka married a French woman named Gilberte Vincent with whom he had two sons.

Notes

Sources in Dutch
 Hoe de Baliër zich kleedt (1926),p. 12
 

1899 births
1967 deaths
Balinese people
Indonesian Hindus
Indonesian politicians
Politicians from Bali
People of the Indonesian National Revolution
People from Gianyar Regency
Politicians from the State of East Indonesia